The men's 100 metres event at the 2010 Asian Games was held at the Aoti Main Stadium, Guangzhou, China on 21–22 November.

Schedule
All times are China Standard Time (UTC+08:00)

Records

Results
Legend
DNS — Did not start
DSQ — Disqualified

Round 1
 Qualification: First 4 in each heat (Q) and the next 4 fastest (q) advance to the semifinals.

Heat 1 
 Wind: +1.2 m/s

Heat 2 
 Wind: 0.0 m/s

Heat 3 
 Wind: −0.1 m/s

Heat 4 
 Wind: +0.3 m/s

Heat 5 
 Wind: +0.8 m/s

Semifinals
 Qualification: First 2 in each heat (Q) and the next 2 fastest (q) advance to the final.

Heat 1 
 Wind: +1.7 m/s

Heat 2 
 Wind: +0.9 m/s

Heat 3 
 Wind: +0.7 m/s

Final 
 Wind: +1.7 m/s

References
Results

Athletics at the 2010 Asian Games
2010